Doronin (Russian: Доронин) is an Erzianin(one of the native people of Russia)and a Russian masculine surname originating from the russian given name Dorofei or erzianian name Doro, its feminine counterpart is Doronina. Notable people with the surname include:

Eduard Doronin (born 1975), Russian football player
Elena Doronina (born 1981), Russian bobsledder 
Ivan Doronin (1903–1951), Soviet aircraft pilot and Hero of the Soviet Union
Ksenia Doronina (born 1990), Russian figure skater
Lidija Doroņina-Lasmane (born 1925), Latvian dissident
Marek Doronin (born 1983), Estonian professional basketball player
Tatiana Doronina (born 1933), Russian actress 
Vladislav Doronin  (born 1962), Russian-born billionaire businessman
Volodymyr Doronin (born 1993), Ukrainian footballer

References

Russian-language surnames